Macrophthalmus is a genus of crabs which are widespread across the Indo-Pacific. It contains the following species (arranged into subgenera):

Subgenus Chaenostoma Stimpson, 1858
Macrophthalmus boscii Audouin, 1826
Macrophthalmus dentatus Stimpson, 1858
Macrophthalmus punctulatus Miers, 1884
Subgenus Euplax H. Milne-Edwards, 1852
Macrophthalmus leptophthalmus H. Milne-Edwards, 1852
Macrophthalmus dagohoyi Mendoza & Ng, 2007
Subgenus Hemiplax Heller, 1865
Macrophthalmus hirtipes (Jacquinot in Hombron & Jacquinot, 1846)
Subgenus Macrophthalmus Desmarest, 1823
Macrophthalmus abbreviatus Manning & Holthuis, 1981
Macrophthalmus banzai Wada & K. Sakai, 1989
Macrophthalmus brevis (Herbst, 1804)
Macrophthalmus ceratophorus Sakai, 1969
Macrophthalmus consobrinus Nobili, 1906
Macrophthalmus convexus Stimpson, 1858
Macrophthalmus crassipes H. Milne-Edwards, 1852
Macrophthalmus darwinensis Barnes, 1971
Macrophthalmus gallardoi Serène, 1971
Macrophthalmus graeffei A. Milne-Edwards, 1873
Macrophthalmus grandidieri A. Milne-Edwards, 1867
Macrophthalmus hilgendorfi Tesch, 1915
Macrophthalmus laevimanus H. Milne-Edwards, 1852
Macrophthalmus latipes Borradaile, 1902
Macrophthalmus malaccensis Tweedie, 1937
Macrophthalmus microfylacas Nagai, Watanabe & Naruse, 2006
Macrophthalmus milloti Crosnier, 1965
Macrophthalmus parvimanus Guérin, 1834
Macrophthalmus philippinensis Serène, 1971
Macrophthalmus sandakani Rathbun, 1907
Macrophthalmus serenei Takeda & Komai, 1991
Macrophthalmus sulcatus H. Milne-Edwards, 1852
Macrophthalmus telescopicus Owen, 1839
Macrophthalmus tomentosus Eydoux & Souleyet, 1842
Macrophthalmus transversus (Latreille, 1817)
Subgenus Mareotis Barnes, 1967
Macrophthalmus abercrombiei Barnes, 1966
Macrophthalmus crinitus Rathbun, 1913
Macrophthalmus definitus Adams & White, 1849
Macrophthalmus depressus Rüppell, 1830
Macrophthalmus frequens Tai & Song, 1984
Macrophthalmus japonicus (De Haan, 1835)
?Macrophthalmus laevis A. Milne-Edwards, 1867
Macrophthalmus pacificus Dana, 1851
Macrophthalmus teschi Kemp, 1919
Macrophthalmus tjiljapensis Pretzmann, 1974
Macrophthalmus tomentosus Eydoux & Souleyet, 1842
Macrophthalmus setosus H. Milne-Edwards, 1852
Subgenus Paramareotis Komai, Goshima & Murai, 1995
Macrophthalmus boteltobagoe Sakai, 1939
Macrophthalmus erato De Man, 1888
Macrophthalmus holthuisi Serène, 1973
Macrophthalmus quadratus A. Milne-Edwards, 1873
Subgenus Tasmanoplax Barnes, 1967
Macrophthalmus latifrons Barnes, 1967
Subgenus Venitus Barnes, 1967
Macrophthalmus barnesi Serène, 1971
Macrophthalmus dentipes Lucas in Guérin-Méneville, 1836
Macrophthalmus gastrodes Kemp, 1915
Macrophthalmus latreillei (Desmarest, 1822)
Macrophthalmus leptophthalmus H. Milne-Edwards, 1852
Macrophthalmus serratus Adams & White, 1849
Macrophthalmus vietnamensis Serène, 1971

References

Ocypodoidea